Rattigeri is a village in Dharwad district of Karnataka, India.

Demographics 
As of the 2011 Census of India there were 247 households in Rattigeri and a total population of 1,195 consisting of 607 males and 588 females. There were 171 children ages 0-6.

References

Villages in Dharwad district